Below are a list of works related to the history of Hollywood, California.

General
 Balio, Tino. (1993). Hollywood in the New Deal. University of Wisconsin Press.
 Balio, Tino. (2008). Grand Design: Hollywood as a Modern Business Enterprise, 1930-1939. University of California Press.
 Basinger, Jeanine. (1999). The Star Machine. Knopf.
 Basinger, Jeanine. (1991). Silent Stars. Knopf.
 Biskind, Peter. (1998). Easy Riders, Raging Bulls: How the Sex-Drugs-and-Rock 'N' Roll Generation Saved Hollywood. Simon & Schuster.
 Brownlow, Kevin. (1968). The Parade's Gone By. University of California Press.
 Brownlow, Kevin. (1996). The War, the West, and the Wilderness. Knopf.
 Caddel, Richard. (2002). Hollywood in Crisis: Cinema and American Society, 1929-1939. Routledge.
 Collins, Dana. (2010). Hollywood and the Culture Elite: How the Movies Became American. Columbia University Press.
 Doherty, Thomas. (2013). Hollywood and Hitler, 1933-1939. Columbia University Press.
 Elsaesser, T., Horwath, A., & King, N. (Eds.). (2004). The Last Great American Picture Show: New Hollywood Cinema in the 1970s. Amsterdam University Press.
 Escoffier, Jeffrey. (2009). Hollywood Renaissance: The Cinema of Democracy in the Era of Ford, Kapra, and Kazan. Columbia University Press.
 Farber, Stephen. (1972). Hollywood on Hollywood. University of California Press.
 Froug, William. (1997). The Screenwriter Looks at the Screenwriter. Silman-James Press.
 Gabler, Neal. (1988). An Empire of Their Own: How the Jews Invented Hollywood. Crown Publishers.
 Harris, Mark. (2005). Pictures at a Revolution: Five Movies and the Birth of the New Hollywood. Penguin Press.
 Higham, Charles. (1972). Hollywood Cameramen: Sources of Light. Southern Illinois University Press.
 Higham, Charles. (1984). Hollywood in the Twenties. A.S. Barnes and Co.
 Hirschhorn, Clive. (1981). The Warner Bros. Story. Crown Publishers.
 Hoberman, J. (2017). An Army of Phantoms: American Movies and the Making of the Cold War. The New Press.
 Kael, Pauline. (1968). Kiss Kiss Bang Bang. Little, Brown and Company.
 King, Geoff. (2001). American Independent Cinema. I.B. Tauris
 Kobal, John. (1985). People Will Talk. Knopf.
 Leff, Leonard J. (1990). Gossip, The Untrivial Pursuit. Charles Scribner's Sons.
 Leff, Leonard J., and Jerold L. Simmons. (2001). The Dame in the Kimono: Hollywood, Censorship, and the Production Code from the 1920s to the 1960s. Grove Press.
 Nystrom, Christina. (2018). Hollywood's East: Orientalism in Film. Indiana University Press.
 Schatz, Thomas. (1981). The Genius of the System: Hollywood Filmmaking in the Studio Era. Holt, Rinehart and Winston.
 Schatz, Thomas. (1988). Hollywood Genres: Formulas, Filmmaking, and the Studio System. McGraw-Hill.
 Schatz, Thomas. (2001). The Genius of the System: Hollywood Filmmaking in the Studio Era. Henry Holt and Company.
 Schickel, Richard. (1991). Intimate Strangers: The Culture of Celebrity. Anchor Books.
 Sklar, Robert. (1994). Movie-Made America: A Cultural History of American Movies. Vintage.
 Thomson, David. (2004). The Whole Equation: A History of Hollywood. Alfred A. Knopf.
 Whitfield, Eileen. (1991). Pickford: The Woman Who Made Hollywood. University Press of Kentucky.
 Wood, Michael. (1990). America in the Movies or "Santa Maria, It Had Slipped My Mind". Basic Books.
 Wood, Robin. (1986). Hollywood from Vietnam to Reagan. Columbia University Press.

Biographical
 Dardis, Tom. (1989). Harold Lloyd: The Man on the Clock. University Press of Kentucky.
 Eyman, Scott. (1997). Lion of Hollywood: The Life and Legend of Louis B. Mayer. Simon & Schuster.
 Eyman, Scott. (2005). Print the Legend: The Life and Times of John Ford. Simon & Schuster.
 Eyman, Scott. (2010). Empire of Dreams: The Epic Life of Cecil B. DeMille. Simon & Schuster.
 Gabler, Neal. (2006). Walt Disney: The Triumph of the American Imagination. Vintage.
 Gabler, Neal. (2007). Winchell: Gossip, Power, and the Culture of Celebrity. Vintage.
 Hirsch, Foster. (2010). The Boys from Syracuse: The Shubert Brothers' Story. University Press of Kentucky.
 LoBrutto, Vincent. (1997). Stanley Kubrick: A Biography. Donald I. Fine.
 McBride, Joseph. (1997). Frank Capra: The Catastrophe of Success. Simon & Schuster.
 McBride, Joseph. (2008). Steven Spielberg: A Biography. University Press of Kentucky.
 McGilligan, Patrick. (1991). Backstory: Interviews with Screenwriters of Hollywood's Golden Age. University of California Press.
 McGilligan, Patrick. (2015). George Cukor: A Double Life. St. Martin's Press.
 Neale, Steve. (2000). Genre and Hollywood. Routledge.
 Schickel, Richard. (1985). D.W. Griffith: An American Life. Simon & Schuster.
 Silet, Charles L. P. (2010). The Films of Josef von Sternberg. McFarland
 Sinyard, Neil. (1986). The Films of Ernst Lubitsch. Cambridge University Press.
 Sklar, Robert. (1994). City Boys: Cagney, Bogart, Garfield. Princeton University Press.
 Spoto, Donald. (1992). The Art of Alfred Hitchcock: Fifty Years of His Motion Pictures. Hopkinson and Blake
 Stenn, David. (1992). Clara Bow: Runnin' Wild. Cooper Square Press.
 Stenn, David. (2001). Bombshell: The Life and Death of Jean Harlow. Cooper Square Press.
 Thomas, Bob. (1988). Thalberg: Life and Legend. G.P. Putnam's Sons.
 Thomas, Tony. (1992). Howard Hawks, the Grey Fox of Hollywood. Grove Press.

Studios
 Balio, Tino. (1996). United Artists: The Company That Changed the Film Industry. University of Wisconsin Press.
 Eames, John Douglas. (1991). The MGM Story: The Complete History of Fifty Roaring Years. Crown Publishers.
 Friedwald, Will. (2010). The Warner Bros. Cartoons. Oxford University Press.
 Gomery, Douglas. (2005). The Hollywood Studio System: A History. St. Martin's Press.

Reference
 Eagan, Daniel. (2010). America's Film Legacy: The Authoritative Guide to the Landmark Movies in the National Film Registry. Continuum.
 Pendergast, Tom, and Sara Pendergast. (1999). International Dictionary of Films and Filmmakers. St. James Press.
 Thompson, David. (2001). The New Biographical Dictionary of Film. Knopf.

See also
 Bibliography of Los Angeles
 Cinema of the United States

References

Notes

Citations

External links
 Bibliography of works about American film, George Mason University

Wikipedia bibliographies
Bibliography